Born Innocent is the first studio album by Red Cross (later known as Redd Kross), released in 1982 on Smoke 7 Records, and re-released in 1986 on Frontier Records featuring different cover art and three bonus tracks taken from the Sudden Death and American Youth Report compilations. The record was produced by Smoke 7 owner, Felix Alanis, who was also the lead singer of RF7.

In 2007 the album was performed live in its entirety as part of the All Tomorrow's Parties-curated Don't Look Back series.

Track listing
All tracks written by Jeff and Steve McDonald except where noted.
 "Linda Blair" – 2:04
 named for the actress Linda Blair, who starred in the 1973 film The Exorcist, as well as starring in the movie that the album was named after.
 "White Trash" – 1:27
 "Everyday There's Someone New" – 1:06
 "Solid Gold" – 1:13
 "Burn-Out" – 1:24
 "Charlie" – 1:47
 "Tatum O'Tot and the Fried Vegetables" – 1:32 [reissue bonus track]
 "St. Lita Ford Blues" – 3:28 [reissue bonus track]
 "Self Respect" – 0:42
 "Pseudo-Intellectual" – 1:12
 "Kill Someone You Hate" – 1:26
 "Look on Up at the Bottom" (Stu Phillips) – 2:11
 cover from Beyond the Valley of the Dolls
 "Cellulite City" – 1:59
 "I'm Alright" – 1:57 
 cover of the Rolling Stones cover of Bo Diddley
 "Cease to Exist" (Charles Manson) – 2:29 
 Charles Manson cover
 "Notes and Chords Mean Nothing to Me" – 2:24 [reissue bonus track]

Personnel
 Jeff McDonald – lead vocals, rhythm guitar
 Tracy Lea – lead guitar
 Steven Shane McDonald – bass, backing vocals
 John Stielow – drums

References

1982 debut albums
Redd Kross albums
Frontier Records albums